Magdalena Johanna Maria "Marleen" Veldhuis (born 29 June 1979) is a retired swimmer from the Netherlands. She was world record holder in four events (one individual event and three relay events). Veldhuis won eight world championships gold medals and 20 European championships gold medals. In the Olympics, she won a bronze medal in London 2012 in the 50 m freestyle, as well as three relay medals: bronze in Athens 2004, gold in Beijing 2008, and silver in London 2012.

Personal life
Veldhuis was born on 29 June 1979 in Borne in the Netherlands. She was brought up in the eastern part of the Netherlands. Veldhuis had a daughter in June 2010, causing her to miss the 2010 European Aquatics Championships, and she returned to swimming for the 2011 and 2012 seasons.

Swimming career

Marleen Veldhuis is a former water polo player which she combined with swimming. After she decided to focus completely on swimming, Veldhuis made her international debut during the 2002 European Aquatics Championships in Berlin, at the relatively late age of 23, where she won a bronze medal in the 4×100 m freestyle as part of a team with Manon van Rooijen, Chantal Groot and Wilma van Hofwegen. At the end of the year, she competed in Riesa for the European Short Course Swimming Championships 2002. There she won bronze medals in both relays, 4×50 m freestyle and 4×50 m medley.

Breakthrough
In April 2003 she joined Topzwemmen Amsterdam (TZA) to train as a full-time professional under the guidance of Fedor Hes. At the 2003 World Aquatics Championships it turned out to be a great decision as she reached two individual finals in the 50 m freestyle ending 7th, and in the 100 m freestyle finishing 8th. In Barcelona she also reached the final in all relay events but did not win a medal. In December she participated in the European Short Course Swimming Championships 2003 where she won her first international titles in the 50 m freestyle and the 4×50 m freestyle. In Dublin she also won silver in the 100 m freestyle and bronze in the 4×50 m medley. 2004 started off with the 2004 European Aquatics Championships in Madrid. There Veldhuis won two silver medals in the 4×100 m freestyle, together with Chantal Groot, Annabel Kosten and Inge Dekker, and individually in the 100 m freestyle. At the end of the week there was a bronze medal in the 4×100 m medley relay alongside Stefanie Luiken, Madelon Baans and Chantal Groot.

2004 Olympics
At the 2004 Summer Olympics Veldhuis made her Olympic debut at the age of 25 and won the bronze medal in the 4×100 m freestyle, together with Inge de Bruijn, Inge Dekker and Chantal Groot. Her individual results at the Olympics were slightly disappointing with the 9th place in the 50 m freestyle and the 11th place in the 100 m freestyle. She was the anchor lady in the 4×100 m medley, she took over from de Bruijn who swam the butterfly leg, finishing 6th. At the end of 2004 she became Amsterdam Sportswoman of the year.

Post-Athens season
In October 2004 she avenged her failed individual Olympic campaign by winning the gold medal in the 50 m freestyle at the 2004 FINA Short Course World Championships in Indianapolis by beating Libby Lenton from Australia and Therese Alshammar from Sweden. In the 100 m freestyle she received a bronze medal behind Lenton and Sweden's Josefin Lillhage. In December she successfully defended her 50 m freestyle at the European Short Course Swimming Championships 2004. In Vienna she also won gold in both 4×50 m freestyle and 4×50 m medley, there was a silver medal for Veldhuis in the 100 m freestyle behind French Malia Metella. She achieved her best long-course result so far by winning the silver medal in the 50 m freestyle at the 2005 World Aquatics Championships in Montreal, which was the only medal for her country during these World Championships. The European Short Course Swimming Championships 2005 were very successful for Veldhuis. In Trieste she defended all her titles from the year before, but now she won also the gold medal in the 100 m freestyle.

2006
In April 2006 alongside Chantal Groot, Hinkelien Schreuder and Inge Dekker, Veldhuis set a world record and won the gold medal in the 4×100 m freestyle relay at the 2006 FINA Short Course World Championships. She failed to defend her 50 m freestyle title ending third. She finished second behind long-time rival Libby Lenton in the 100 m freestyle. In the summer she competed in the 2006 European Aquatics Championships, in Budapest, Hungary where she ended second in the 100 m freestyle, behind German's Britta Steffen who broke the world record, and third in the 50 m freestyle. In the 4×100 m freestyle relay she received a silver medal together with Chantal Groot, Inge Dekker and newcomer Ranomi Kromowidjojo. After these Championships she split up with her coach, Fedor Hes, and started to work with Jacco Verhaeren, who at the time was also working with triple Olympic champion Pieter van den Hoogenband. In Helsinki she successfully defended her 50 m and 100 m freestyle titles at the European Short Course Swimming Championships 2006, but lost her relay titles when her team ended second in the 4×50 m freestyle and did not start in the 4×50 m medley. Just before this championships she had bettered Annemarie Verstappen's long standing 200 m freestyle national record.

2007
In the spring of 2007 she took part in the 2007 World Aquatics Championships in Melbourne, Australia. There she won the silver medal behind Libby Lenton. Veldhuis won the bronze medal in the 50 m freestyle despite being the favourite before the final. Alongside Inge Dekker, Ranomi Kromowidjojo, and another young talent Femke Heemskerk, she won bronze in the 4×100 m freestyle relay. In November at the Berlin leg of the 2007 FINA Swimming World Cup series, Veldhuis broke Swede Therese Alshammar's 50 m freestyle world record. Alshammar's world record had stood at 23.59 since March 2000. The new standard is 23.58 seconds. One month later she qualified for the Beijing Olympics with personal bests in the 50 and 100 m freestyle during the Dutch Open Swim Cup 2007 and competed at the European Short Course Swimming Championships 2007. In Debrecen she won the 50 m freestyle for the fifth time in a row but lost her 100 m freestyle title to Britta Steffen due to a bad turn, finishing second. She also won gold in the 4×50 m freestyle. A few days after the tournament she was elected Dutch Sportswoman of the Year.

Spring 2008 
In March 2008 at the 2008 European Aquatics Championships in Eindhoven, she won the 100 m and 50 m freestyle. In the latter event she broke the eight-year-old world record by since 2004 retired Inge de Bruijn with a time of 24.09. She also broke the 4×100 m freestyle relay world record, together with Inge Dekker, Ranomi Kromowidjojo and Femke Heemskerk, and won the gold medal. The new standard was 3:33.62. Veldhuis also won a bronze medal in 4×100 m medley alongside Hinkelien Schreuder, Jolijn van Valkengoed and Inge Dekker. In April's 2008 FINA Short Course World Championships in Manchester Veldhuis won four gold medals. Individually in the 50 m freestyle, lowering her own world record to 23.25, and the 100 m freestyle beating home favourite Francesca Halsall. Furthermore, she won gold in the 4×200 m freestyle with Dekker, Heemskerk and Kromowidjojo, bettering the world record. With Hinkelien Schreuder replacing Kromowidjojo, the Dutch team also lowered their own world record in the 4×100 m freestyle.

2008 Summer Olympics

At the 2008 Summer Olympics she won the gold medal in the 4×100 m freestyle relay together with Inge Dekker, Ranomi Kromowidjojo and Femke Heemskerk, they swam just 0.14 seconds outside their own world record. Individually she did not achieve what she expected to, with the sixth place in the 100 m freestyle and the fifth in the 50 m freestyle.

Fall 2008
Veldhuis kicked off her new season at the Swim Cup Eindhoven 2008. She qualified for the 50 m and 100 m butterfly at the 2009 World Aquatics Championships, for the 50 m and 100 m freestyle she had already qualified at the Olympics. The next week, she won four gold medals at the European Short Course Swimming Championships 2008 in Rijeka, Croatia, in the 50 m and 100 m freestyle and 4×50 m freestyle and 4×50 m medley. In the 100 m freestyle she lowered her own European record during the heats, she also finished fourth in the 100 m butterfly.

2009
During the Amsterdam Swim Cup Veldhuis broke the 50 metre butterfly world record and 50 metre freestyle world record on the same day. At the 2009 World Aquatics Championships in Rome, Italy she won the gold medal in the 4×100 m freestyle alongside Inge Dekker, Ranomi Kromowidjojo and Femke Heemskerk.

2011
In 2011 Veldhuis won a gold medal at the 2011 World Aquatics Championships as part of the 4 × 100 m freestyle relay alongside Inge Dekker, Ranomi Kromowidjojo and Femke Heemskerk in a time of 3:33.96.

2012
At the 2012 Summer Olympics she won a bronze medal in the 50 m freestyle (her first Olympic medal in an individual event, in a time of 24.39) and a silver medal in the 4 × 100 m freestyle.

Personal bests

References

External links

 
 
 
 

1979 births
Living people
People from Borne, Overijssel
Olympic swimmers of the Netherlands
Dutch female butterfly swimmers
Dutch female freestyle swimmers
Swimmers at the 2004 Summer Olympics
Swimmers at the 2008 Summer Olympics
Swimmers at the 2012 Summer Olympics
Olympic gold medalists for the Netherlands
Olympic silver medalists for the Netherlands
Olympic bronze medalists for the Netherlands
World record setters in swimming
Olympic bronze medalists in swimming
World Aquatics Championships medalists in swimming
Medalists at the FINA World Swimming Championships (25 m)
European Aquatics Championships medalists in swimming
Medalists at the 2012 Summer Olympics
Medalists at the 2008 Summer Olympics
Medalists at the 2004 Summer Olympics
Olympic gold medalists in swimming
Olympic silver medalists in swimming
Sportspeople from Overijssel
21st-century Dutch women